Calochortus umbellatus is a flowering plant in the lily family found only in California in the United States.  The common name for this species is Oakland mariposa lily or Oakland star-tulip.

Distribution
The species is a California endemic of limited distribution. 
It grows primarily in the San Francisco Bay Region, often on serpentine soils, with a few isolated populations in Humboldt, Mendocino, and Nevada Counties.

Description
Calochortus umbellatus is a branching perennial herb up to 25 cm tall. Inflorescence is sub-umbellate with 3-10 white or pale pink flowers.

This species is included on the California Native Plant Society list 4.2 of rare and endangered plants.

References

umbellatus
Plants described in 1868
Endemic flora of California